The Priddle Concern is a Canadian indie rock band formed in Toronto, Ontario by Bill Priddle.

History

Priddle formed The Priddle Concern in 2008 and began performing around Ontario. It was his first project after leaving Treble Charger in 2003. The band consists of Priddle on vocals and guitar, Mitch Bowden (formerly of Chore) on guitar, Scott Remila of Raising the Fawn on bass and Dave Dunham of Chore on drums. Priddle is also a supporting musician in Don Vail, a band fronted by Bowden.

The band signed with Sparks Music and released its debut album, The Priddle Concern in 2008. The album included contributions from several members of Broken Social Scene.

Band members
Bill Priddle - lead vocals, guitar (2008–present)
Mitch Bowden - guitar (2008–present)
Scott Remila - bass (2008–present)
David Dunham - drums, percussion (2008–present)

Discography
The Priddle Concern (2008)
Untitled Second Album (2011)

References
Citations

External links
 The Priddle Concern official website
 The Priddle Concern Profile on CBC Radio 3</ref>

Musical groups established in 2008
Musical groups from Toronto
Canadian indie rock groups
2008 establishments in Ontario